Maite is a female given name of Basque origin meaning love, popular throughout the Hispanic world and Brazil.

In Spanish, its pronunciation is usually stressed on the first syllable (/'majte/), written as Maite. As a nickname for "María Teresa" and "María Esther", however, it is most frequently stressed on the last syllable (/maj'te/) and written as Mayté.

In Brazilian Portuguese, it is normally pronounced in three syllables and stressed on the last (/mai'te/), written as Maitê, or less frequently as Maytê.
In French, the spelling is Maïté.

People 
 Maïté, French television cooking host
 Maïté Duval (1944-2019), Dutch-French sculptress 
 Maité Allamand (1911–1996), Chilean writer and diplomat
 Maite Aranburu, Basque politician
 Maite Delgado, Venezuelan leader
 Maite Dono (born 1969), Spanish singer-songwriter, poet, and actress
 Maite Kelly, Irish pop singer from the band Kelly Family
 Maite Oroz (born 1998), Spanish footballer
 Maite Perroni, Mexican actress and singer
 Maitê Proença, Brazilian actress
 Maite Schwartz, American actress
 Maite Zúñiga, Spanish athlete

Mayte may refer to:
 Mayte Garcia, dancer, singer and former wife of pop star Prince
 Mayte Macanás, Spanish singer and participant in Operación Triunfo
 Mayte Martínez, Spanish athlete
 Mayte Mateos, member of Spanish 70s disco duo Baccara 
 Maytê Piragibe, Brazilian actress
 Mayte Rodriguez or Michelle Rodriguez, American actress

Feminine given names
Basque feminine given names